"Shadows" is a song and single by Gibraltarian flamenco metal band Breed 77 which first appeared on the Breed 77 album.

It was released in three different formats: a double A-side CD with an acoustic version of "Breaking the Silence"; an enhanced CD including the video and remixes; and a double A-side vinyl which features a "Metal Mix" of both "Shadows" and "A Matter of Time" (Cultura). "Shadows" just failed to reach the UK Top 40 by a small margin, attaining only number 42.

Track 1 & 2 (CDs) were written by Paul Isola, Danny Felice, Stuart Cavilla and Pete Chichone. Track 2 (vinyl) was written by Danny Felice, Paul Isola, Pedro Caparros and Stu Cavilla.

The line-up for this single consisted of Paul Isola, Danny Felice, Stuart Cavilla, Pete Chichone and Pedro Caparros.

Track listing
 "Shadows Sombras Latinas"
 "Shadows" (Mayhem Mix)
 "Shadows" (Metal Mix 2005) 
 "Breaking the Silence" (Acústico)
 "A Matter of Time" (Metal Mix 2005)

References

2005 singles
Breed 77 songs
2005 songs
Albert Productions singles